Janevski, Yanevski or Ianevski (Macedonian: Јаневски; Bulgarian: Яневски) is a Macedonian surname. Notable people with the surname include:

Čedomir Janevski (born 1961), Macedonian footballer and current manager
Jane Janevski (born 1920), Macedonian football manager and former player
Marjan Janevski (born 1988), Macedonian basketball player
Slavko Janevski (1920–2000), Macedonian artist
Stanislav Ianevski (born 1985), Bulgarian actor 
Vlado Janevski (born 1960), Macedonian singer

See also
Yanev

Macedonian-language surnames